The Diocese of Copenhagen (Danish: Københavns Stift) is a diocese within the Evangelical Lutheran Church of Denmark. The Bishop of Copenhagen is currently Peter Skov-Jakobsen, who replaced Erik Normann Svendsen in 2009. The main cathedral of the diocese is the Church of Our Lady in Copenhagen.

The Bishop of Copenhagen has a special status as primus inter pares among the Danish bishops, but does not bear the title "archbishop" because he does not hold Metropolitan status. The Bishop of Zealand formerly held this title, until the Diocese of Copenhagen was created in 1922. Though the bishop acts as the main authority among other bishops, the supreme authority of the church rests with The Queen of Denmark, while the administrative head is the Minister for Ecclesiastical Affairs.

The Diocese of Copenhagen was formed in 1922 when the Diocese of Zealand was divided in two, the other portion forming the Diocese of Roskilde. The diocese was further split in 1961, when the Diocese of Helsingør disjoined.

List of Bishops
Harald Ostenfeld, 1922–1934
Hans Fuglsang Damgaard, 1934–1960
Willy Westergaard Madsen, 1960–1975
Ole Bertelsen, 1975–1992
Erik Norman Svendsen, 1992–2009
Peter Skov-Jakobsen, 2009–present

See also

Bispegården, Copenhagen
List of churches in Copenhagen
List of Lutheran dioceses and archdioceses

References

Church of Denmark dioceses
Diocese of Copenhagen
1922 establishments in Denmark
Diocese of Copenhagen
Diocese of Copenhagen